Capital Area District Libraries (CADL) is a system of libraries in Ingham County, Michigan, United States. It was formed in 1998 by an agreement between Ingham County and the City of Lansing. It consists of thirteen libraries and a mobile library. CADL is governed by a seven-member board, five of which are selected by Ingham County, and the remaining two are selected by the City of Lansing. CADL also participates with the Michigan eLibrary.  The Friends of the Library support Capital Area District Libraries through fundraising and community outreach.

The City of East Lansing maintains a separate library system (East Lansing Public Library).

Administration and board
 Management team 
 Board of trustees

Branches
 CADL Aurelius - Aurelius
 CADL Dansville - Dansville
 CADL Foster - Lansing
 CADL Haslett - Haslett
 CADL Holt-Delhi - Holt
 CADL Okemos - Okemos
 CADL Leslie - Leslie
 CADL Downtown Lansing - Lansing
 CADL Mason - Mason
 CADL South Lansing - Lansing
 CADL Stockbridge - Stockbridge
 CADL Webberville - Webberville
 CADL Williamston - Williamston
 Mobile Library

StoryWalk® 
StoryWalk® encourages families to enjoy reading and the outdoors by posting a children's book - a page or two at a time - at intervals in a park, hiking trail or other outdoor site. StoryWalk includes activities like talking, reading, writing, singing and playing to help your child develop important early literacy skills.CADL has 11 sites throughout Ingham County, Michigan.

Student Success Initiative 
The Student Success Initiative debuted in 2019, beginning with nearly 600 students in Webberville, Michigan. To date more than 20,000 students from 10 different Michigan school districts (Dansville, Haslett, Holt, Lansing, Leslie, Mason, Okemos, Stockbridge, Webberville and Williamston). Through this initiative, students in participating districts can get a library card no matter where they live. It gives them access to books, audiobooks, magazines and more in both digital and physical formats.

Awards and recognition
 2020 Michigan Library Association Public Librarian of the Year (Jessica Trotter) 
 2020 American Library Association PR Xchange Award Competition Winner (four winning entries)  
 2019 State Librarian's Award of Excellence
 2019 Library of Michigan's Quality Services Audit Checklist Award (Excellent Level)

References

 2020 Annual Report 
 2019 Annual Report 
 2018 Annual Report 
 2017 Annual Report 
 2016 Annual Report

External links
CADL Official web site
lib-web-cats

Public libraries in Michigan
Library districts
Education in Lansing, Michigan
Education in Ingham County, Michigan
1998 establishments in Michigan